

Events 
Cipriano de Rore leaves his post as maestro di cappella in Ferrara when Alfonso II becomes duke.

Publications 
Filippo Azzaiolo – , for four voices (Venice: Antonio Gardano)
Jacob Clemens non Papa
Eighth book of masses:  for five voices (Leuven: Pierre Phalèse), published posthumously
Ninth book of masses:   for six voices (Leuven: Pierre Phalèse), published posthumously
First through sixth books of motets for four voices (Leuven: Pierre Phalèse), published posthumously
Pierre Clereau
Johannes de Cleve
First book of motets for four, five, and six voices (Augsburg: Philipp Ulhard)
Second book of motets for four, five, and six voices (Augsburg: Philipp Ulhard)
Thomas Crecquillon – Seventh book of motets for four voices (Leuven: Pierre Phalèse), published posthumously
Nicolao Dorati – Second book of madrigals for five, six, seven, and eight voices (Venice: Girolamo Scotto)
Philibert Jambe de Fer –  (Lyon: Michel Du Bois)
Clément Janequin –  (Paris: Le Roy & Ballard), published posthumously
Mattheus Le Maistre –  for three voices (Nuremberg: Johann Berg & Ulrich Neuber)
Costanzo Porta
First book of madrigals for five voices (Venice: Antonio Gardano)
First book of motets for four voices (Venice: Antonio Gardano)
Adrian Willaert – Musica Nova

Births 
date unknown - Adam Gumpelzhaimer, Bavarian composer and music theorist (died 1625)

Deaths 
October 2 – Jacquet of Mantua, composer (born 1483)
date unknown
Jacques Collebaut, Breton composer
Nicolas Payen, choirmaster and composer (born c. 1512)

 
Music
16th century in music
Music by year